Żerań Heat Power Station is a coal-fired heat power station in the northeastern Warsaw suburb of Żerań, Poland. Built between 1952 and 1956 to Soviet design specifications – with the first turbine becoming operational on 21 July 1954 – it underwent modernisation in the years 1997-2001 when it was taken over by Vattenfall. It is now owned by PGNiG. The station has a heat generation capacity of 1,561 MW and an electric generation capacity of 350 MW.

References

Energy infrastructure completed in 1954
Energy infrastructure completed in 1956
Coal-fired power stations in Poland
Cogeneration power stations in Poland
Buildings and structures in Warsaw
Białołęka